Juho Tommila (born 9 February 1993) is a Finnish ice hockey defenceman currently playing for Lukko of the Finnish Liiga.

Tommila made his SM-liiga debut playing with Lukko during the 2012–13 SM-liiga season.

References

External links

1993 births
Living people
Finnish ice hockey defencemen
Lukko players
People from Rauma, Finland
Sportspeople from Satakunta